Edward Pinkney Wroth (January 11, 1889 – June 22, 1946) was third bishop of the Episcopal Diocese of Erie, now Northwestern Pennsylvania.

Early life and education
Wroth was born on January 11, 1889, in Darlington, Maryland, son of the Reverend Edward Worrell Wroth and Margret Gilpin Price. He was educated at the schools of Baltimore and at the Latin school of Baltimore. He studied at Trinity College, Hartford and graduated with a Bachelor of Arts in 1915. He also graduated from the Virginia Theological Seminary with a Bachelor of Divinity in 1917.

Ordained Ministry
Wroth was ordained deacon on  April 29, 1917 in All Saints' Church, Baltimore, and priest on March 17, 1918, both by Bishop John Gardner Murray of Maryland. He was assigned to Christ Church in Baltimore, the church where he was ordained priest. In 1918 he became rector of Trinity Church in Baltimore. Later he served as rector of Ascension Church in Washington, D.C., of St Peter's parish in Poolesville, Maryland, St Philip's in Laurel, Maryland and rector of Christ Church in Washington, D.C. In 1930, he became rector of Trinity Memorial Church in Warren, Pennsylvania.

Bishop
Wroth was elected Bishop of Erie on the eighth ballot, during the 33rd Annual diocesan convention which took place in 1943. He was consecrated on September 16, 1943 by Presiding Bishop Henry St. George Tucker in St Paul's Cathedral, Erie, Pennsylvania. Wroth died in office three years later, on June 22, 1946, in Erie, due to Coronary thrombosis.

References 

1889 births
1946 deaths
People from Darlington, Maryland
20th-century American Episcopalians
Episcopal bishops of Northwestern Pennsylvania